Mukund Pur is a census town in Central district in the Indian territory of Delhi. Mukund
pur is Situated at North Delhi , in burari  constituency. The Small Town has Highest Population Density Among the Few Towns of delhi.

References

Cities and towns in North Delhi district